Vindula dejone, the Malay cruiser, is a butterfly from the family Nymphalidae found in Southeast Asia. It is sexually dimorphic.

Larvae feed on Adenia.

Subspecies
Listed alphabetically:
V. d. ambonensis Nieuwenhuis – (Ambon)
V. d. austrosundana (Fruhstorfer, 1897) – (Java, Lesser Sunda Islands, Kalao)
V. d. bagrada (Fruhstorfer, 1912) – (Timor, Wetar)
V. d. buruana (Fruhstorfer, 1902) – (Buru)
V. d. bushi Tsukada, 1985 – (Kabaena)
V. d. celebensis (Butler, 1874) – (Sulawesi)
V. d. cycnia de Nicéville – (Kai Island)
V. d. dajakorum (Fruhstorfer, 1906) – (Borneo)
V. d. dejone (Erichson, 1834) – (Philippines)
V. d. dioneia (Fruhstorfer, 1912) – (Sula Island)
V. d. dorokusana (Fruhstorfer, 1899) – (Bachan, Halmahera)
V. d. erotella (Butler, 1879) – (southern Thailand to Singapore)
V. d. erotoides de Nicéville – (Sumatra)
V. d. javana Fruhstorfer – (Java)
V. d. kabiana (Fruhstorfer, 1912) – Salayer
V. d. natunensis (Fruhstorfer, 1906) – (Natuna Islands)
V. d. obiensis (Rothschild, 1899) – (Obi)
V. d. rafflesi Pendlebury, 1939 (Aur, Malaysia)
V. d. satellitica (Fruhstorfer, 1899) – (Banggai)
V. d. susanoo Tsukada, 1985 – (Talaud)
V. d. tiomana (Pendlebury, 1933) (Tioman, Malaysia)
V. d. hildae (Casteleyn, 2008) (Kaledupa, Wangi-wangi, Binongko)
V. d. huyghei (Casteleyn, 2008) (Pagai)
V. d. elisae (Casteleyn, 2008) (Batuatas)

References 

Vagrantini
Butterflies of Singapore
Butterflies of Borneo
Butterflies of Indochina
Butterflies described in 1834